Aleksandar Veljanovski (born 11 January 1984) is a retired Swiss football midfielder.

He previously played with Macedonian club FK Napredok, and Swiss clubs FC BadenFC Wangen bei Olten, FC Solothurn, FC Gossau and SC Zofingen.

Alex is of Macedonian descent.

References

External sources
 

Living people
1984 births
Swiss people of Macedonian descent
Swiss men's footballers
Swiss expatriate footballers
Association football midfielders
FC Wangen bei Olten players
FC Solothurn players
FC Gossau players
FC Grenchen players
Expatriate footballers in North Macedonia